Bethel African Methodist Episcopal Church was a historic church at 519 W. Page St. in Malvern, Arkansas. The African Methodist Episcopal congregation in Malvern was founded in 1894 as St. Luke's African Methodist Episcopal Church. The congregation began plans for a new church building in 1916; the new building was designed by Alfred W. Woods in the Gothic Revival style. The church was completed in 1920. The congregation no longer used the building as a church, but the building was still considered an important landmark in the history of Malvern's African-American community.

The church was added to the National Register of Historic Places on May 26, 2004.  It was delisted on June 12, 2013, following its demolition earlier in the year.

References

African Methodist Episcopal churches in Arkansas
Churches on the National Register of Historic Places in Arkansas
Churches completed in 1920
Buildings and structures in Malvern, Arkansas
Gothic Revival church buildings in Arkansas
National Register of Historic Places in Hot Spring County, Arkansas
1920 establishments in Arkansas